The Tour d'Eure-et-Loir is a multi-day road cycling race that has been held annually in the Eure-et-Loir department of France since 1949. It has been part of UCI Europe Tour in category 2.2 since 2019.

Winners

References

Cycle races in France
1949 establishments in France
Recurring sporting events established in 1949
UCI Europe Tour races